Kambalapadu Ediga Krishnamurthy (born 2 October 1938), popularly known as K. E. Krishnamurthy, is the former Deputy Chief Minister of Andhra Pradesh from Telugu Desam Party. He also held the Revenue, Stamps & Registration portfolios during his tenure as a Cabinet minister in the TDP ministry (2014-2019). He is representing Pattikonda Assembly constituency. Also he worked as a minister in cabinet of Tanguturi Anjaiah.

Krishnamurthy was also the four-term MLA representing Dhone assembly constituency of Kurnool district from both Indian National Congress and Telugu Desam party.

Personal details 
K. E. Krishnamurthy was born on 2 October 1938 in Kurnool to K. E. Madanna and K. E. Madamma. He pursued M.A. from Sri Venkateswara University and L.L.B. from Sagar University, Madhya Pradesh.

Political career 
Following the footsteps of his father, who was the former MLA and MLC, Krishnamurthy entered into politics after his father retired from politics in 1978. He frequently toggled between two main political parties Indian National Congress and Telugu Desam Party in Andhra Pradesh whenever his individuality and political interests of his followers were not recognized and respected by the high command of the respective parties.

Krishnamurthy made his debut as MLA from Dhone assembly constituency in 1978 from the Indian National Congress. He got elected as MLA for a second term from the same constituency in 1983 from the Indian National Congress party.

He later resigned from Indian National Congress (INC) party and joined the Telugu Desam Party and won a third term as MLA from the same Dhone constituency in 1985.

Having differences with former Chief Minister of Andhra Pradesh, N. T. Rama Rao of TDP, he resigned from TDP to join INC again to win a fourth time as MLA from Dhone in 1989.

During his stint as MLA, he worked as a minister in both the cabinets of former chief ministers of Andhra Pradesh, Tanguturi Anjaiah belonging to the INC party and N. T. Rama Rao belonging to the TDP party.

He once again resigned from INC and shifted to TDP in 1998 under the leadership of chief minister Nara Chandrababu Naidu and lost by a small margin by contesting Kurnool parliamentary constituency. He won as a member of the parliament of India in 1999 representing Kurnool parliamentary constituency from TDP to enter 13th Lok Sabha. When he was the member of parliament, he was a member of Committee on Defence and Committee on Public Undertakings.

In 2004, he lost by contesting Kurnool parliamentary constituency. At present, he is the Deputy Chief Minister of Andhra Pradesh and also he is holding Revenue, Stamps & Registration portfolios and Polit Bureau member of the TDP which is in power.

In 2009, he got re-elected as M.L.A. from Dhone assembly constituency.

In 2014 he won as MLA from Pattikonda assembly constituency as he became the Deputy Chief Minister of Andhra Pradesh and also he is holding Revenue, Stamps & Registration portfolios.

References 

Indian National Congress politicians from Andhra Pradesh
Telugu Desam Party politicians
1938 births
Living people
Telugu politicians
India MPs 1999–2004
Members of the Andhra Pradesh Legislative Assembly
Deputy Chief Ministers of Andhra Pradesh
Sri Venkateswara University alumni
People from Kurnool district
Lok Sabha members from Andhra Pradesh
Third N. Chandrababu Naidu Cabinet (2014–2019)